Transpiration is the process of water movement through a plant and its evaporation from aerial parts, such as leaves, stems and flowers. Water is necessary for plants but only a small amount of water taken up by the roots is used for growth and metabolism. The remaining 97–99.5% is lost by transpiration and guttation. Leaf surfaces are dotted with pores called stomata (singular "stoma"), and in most plants they are more numerous on the undersides of the foliage. The stomata are bordered by guard cells and their stomatal accessory cells (together known as stomatal complex) that open and close the pore. Transpiration occurs through the stomatal apertures, and can be thought of as a necessary "cost" associated with the opening of the stomata to allow the diffusion of carbon dioxide gas from the air for photosynthesis. Transpiration also cools plants, changes osmotic pressure of cells, and enables mass flow of mineral nutrients and water from roots to shoots. Two major factors influence the rate of water flow from the soil to the roots: the hydraulic conductivity of the soil and the magnitude of the pressure gradient through the soil. Both of these factors influence the rate of bulk flow of water moving from the roots to the stomatal pores in the leaves via the xylem.

Mass flow of liquid water from the roots to the leaves is driven in part by capillary action, but primarily driven by water potential differences. If the water potential in the ambient air is lower than the water potential in the leaf airspace of the stomatal pore, water vapor will travel down the gradient and move from the leaf airspace to the atmosphere. This movement lowers the water potential in the leaf airspace and causes evaporation of liquid water from the mesophyll cell walls. This evaporation increases the tension on the water menisci in the cell walls and decreases their radius and thus the tension that is exerted on the water in the cells. Because of the cohesive properties of water, the tension travels through the leaf cells to the leaf and stem xylem where a momentary negative pressure is created as water is pulled up the xylem from the roots. As evaporation occurs at the leaf surface, the properties of adhesion and cohesion work in tandem to pull water molecules from the roots, through xylem tissue, and out of the plant through stomata. In taller plants and trees, the force of gravity pulling the water inside can only be overcome by the decrease in hydrostatic pressure in the upper parts of the plants due to the diffusion of water out of stomata into the atmosphere. Water is absorbed by the roots by osmosis, and any dissolved mineral nutrients travel with it through the xylem.

The cohesion-tension theory explains how leaves pull water through the xylem. Water molecules stick together or exhibit cohesion. As a water molecule evaporates from the surface of the leaf, it pulls on the adjacent water molecule, creating a continuous flow of water through the plant.

Etymology
We can see the history of the word transpiration when we break it down into trans, a Latin noun that means "across," and spiration, which comes from the Latin verb spīrāre, meaning "to breathe." The motion suffix adds the meaning "the act of," so we can see transpiration is, literally, "the ACT of breathing across," which clearly identifies vapor emission from plant leaves.

Capillary action
Capillary action is the process of a liquid flowing in narrow spaces without the assistance of, or even in opposition to, external forces like gravity. The effect can be seen in the drawing up of liquids between the hairs of a paint-brush, in a thin tube, in porous materials such as paper and plaster, in some non-porous materials such as sand and liquefied carbon fiber, or in a biological cell. It occurs because of intermolecular forces between the liquid and surrounding solid surfaces. If the diameter of the tube is sufficiently small, then the combination of surface tension (which is caused by cohesion within the liquid) and adhesive forces between the liquid and container wall act to propel the liquid.

Regulation
Plants regulate the rate of transpiration by controlling the size of the stomatal apertures. The rate of transpiration is also influenced by the evaporative demand of the atmosphere surrounding the leaf such as boundary layer conductance, humidity, temperature, wind, and incident sunlight. Along with above-ground factors, soil temperature and moisture can influence stomatal opening, and thus transpiration rate. The amount of water lost by a plant also depends on its size and the amount of water absorbed at the roots. Transpiration accounts for most of the water loss by a plant by the leaves and young stems. Transpiration serves to evaporatively cool plants, as the evaporating water carries away heat energy due to its large latent heat of vaporization of 2260 kJ per liter.

During a growing season, a leaf will transpire many times more water than its own weight. An acre of corn gives off about 3,000–4,000 gallons (11,400–15,100 liters) of water each day, and a large oak tree can transpire 40,000 gallons (151,000 liters) per year. The transpiration ratio is the ratio of the mass of water transpired to the mass of dry matter produced; the transpiration ratio of crops tends to fall between 200 and 1000 (i.e., crop plants transpire 200 to 1000 kg of water for every kg of dry matter produced).

Transpiration rates of plants can be measured by a number of techniques, including potometers, lysimeters, porometers, photosynthesis systems and thermometric sap flow sensors. Isotope measurements indicate transpiration is the larger component of evapotranspiration. Recent evidence from a global study of water stable isotopes shows that transpired water is isotopically different from groundwater and streams. This suggests that soil water is not as well mixed as widely assumed.

Desert plants have specially adapted structures, such as thick cuticles, reduced leaf areas, sunken stomata and hairs to reduce transpiration and conserve water. Many cacti conduct photosynthesis in succulent stems, rather than leaves, so the surface area of the shoot is very low. Many desert plants have a special type of photosynthesis, termed crassulacean acid metabolism or CAM photosynthesis, in which the stomata are closed during the day and open at night when transpiration will be lower.

Cavitation 
To maintain the pressure gradient necessary for a plant to remain healthy they must continuously uptake water with their roots. They need to be able to meet the demands of water lost due to transpiration. If a plant is incapable of bringing in enough water to remain in equilibrium with transpiration an event known as cavitation occurs. Cavitation is when the plant cannot supply its xylem with adequate water so instead of being filled with water the xylem begins to be filled with water vapor. These particles of water vapor come together and form blockages within the xylem of the plant. This prevents the plant from being able to transport water throughout its vascular system. There is no apparent pattern of where cavitation occurs throughout the plant's xylem. If not effectively taken care of, cavitation can cause a plant to reach its permanent wilting point, and die. Therefore, the plant must have a method by which to remove this cavitation blockage, or it must create a new connection of vascular tissue throughout the plant. The plant does this by closing its stomates overnight, which halts the flow of transpiration. This then allows for the roots to generate over 0.05 mPa of pressure, and that is capable of destroying the blockage and refilling the xylem with water, reconnecting the vascular system. If a plant is unable to generate enough pressure to eradicate the blockage it must prevent the blockage from spreading with the use of pit pears and then create new xylem that can re-connect the vascular system of the plant.

Scientists have begun using magnetic resonance imaging (MRI) to monitor the internal status of the xylem during transpiration, in a non invasive manner. This method of imaging allows for scientists to visualize the movement of water throughout the entirety of the plant. It also is capable of viewing what phase the water is in while in the xylem, which makes it possible to visualize cavitation events. Scientists were able to see that over the course of 20 hours of sunlight more than 10 xylem vessels began filling with gas particles becoming cavitated. MRI technology also made it possible to view the process by which these xylem structures are repaired in the plant. After three hours in darkness it was seen that the vascular tissue was resupplied with liquid water. This was possible because in darkness the stomates of the plant are closed and transpiration no longer occurs. When transpiration is halted the cavitation bubbles are destroyed by the pressure generated by the roots. These observations suggest that MRIs are capable of monitoring the functional status of xylem and allows scientists to view cavitation events for the first time.

Effects on the environment

Cooling

See also

 Antitranspirant – a substance to prevent transpiration
 Canopy conductance
 Ecohydrology
 Eddy covariance flux (aka eddy correlation, eddy flux)
 Hydrology (agriculture)
 Latent heat flux
 Perspiration
 Soil plant atmosphere continuum
 Stomatal conductance
 Transpiration stream
 Turgor pressure
 Water Evaluation And Planning system (WEAP)

References

External links 
 USGS The Water Cycle: Evapotranspiration

Hydrology
Plant physiology